Shangzayü is a town of Zayü County, in southeastern Tibet Autonomous Region, People's Republic of China (PRC), located in a deep river valley  from the county seat and bordering India's Arunachal Pradesh, which is claimed by the PRC, to the south and west.

References 

Populated places in Nyingchi
Township-level divisions of Tibet